Fatima Moreira de Melo (born 4 July 1978) is a former Dutch field hockey player and professional poker player of Portuguese descent. She has played 191 international matches for the Dutch national team, where she has scored 30 times. De Melo's debut match was on 21 October 1997 against Germany, which ended in a 2–1 victory for The Netherlands. She plays on the position of striker. In the Dutch national competition she has played for Tempo '34, HGC and HC Rotterdam. De Melo was part of the Dutch squad that became World Champion at the 2006 Women's Hockey World Cup and which won the 2007 Champions Trophy. In December 2006, she became Rotterdam Sportswoman of the Year and became the new face of the Rabobank in their Dutch TV advertisements.

At the 2008 Summer Olympics in Beijing, she won an Olympic gold medal with the Dutch national team beating China in the final 2–0.

Besides playing field hockey, de Melo also studied at the Erasmus University Rotterdam where she obtained an LL.M. degree in Criminal law in 2006. She furthermore has presented TV programs for both local and national TV stations. She also has a career as a singer. She performed the theme song for the International Hockey Federation's International Year of the Youth at the closing of the 2001 Men's World Cup Hockey Qualifier in Edinburgh. De Melo's father is a Portuguese diplomat stationed in the Netherlands. Her boyfriend is pro-tennis player Raemon Sluiter.

De Melo belonged to the Team PokerStars: Sportstars, and one could find her playing tournaments behind the nickname FatimaDeMelo on the PokerStars online poker card room. She left her role as Sporting Icon Pro in early 2020.

References

External links
 
 Official site for her music career
 
 
 

1978 births
Living people
Dutch female field hockey players
Dutch people of Portuguese descent
Female poker players
Field hockey players at the 2000 Summer Olympics
Field hockey players at the 2004 Summer Olympics
Field hockey players at the 2008 Summer Olympics
Medalists at the 2000 Summer Olympics
Medalists at the 2004 Summer Olympics
Medalists at the 2008 Summer Olympics
Olympic bronze medalists for the Netherlands
Olympic field hockey players of the Netherlands
Olympic gold medalists for the Netherlands
Olympic medalists in field hockey
Olympic silver medalists for the Netherlands
Sportspeople from Rotterdam
HGC players
HC Rotterdam players